Boys are young male humans.

Boys or The Boys may also refer to:

Film and television

Films
 The Boys (1962 British film), a courtroom drama by Sidney J. Furie
 The Boys (1962 Finnish film), a war drama by Mikko Niskanen
 Boys (1977 film), a Danish film by Nils Malmros
 Boys (1983 film), a Soviet crime drama by Dinara Asanova
 Boys (1990 film), a Soviet drama by Yuri Grigoryev and Renata Grigoryeva
 The Boys (1991 film), an American television film by Glenn Jordan
 Boys (1996 film), an American film by Stacy Cochran
 Les Boys (lit. The Boys), a 1997 Canadian film by Louis Saia
 The Boys (1998 film), an Australian film by Rowan Woods
 Boys (2003 film), an Indian Tamil film by S. Shankar
 The Boys: The Sherman Brothers' Story, a 2009 American documentary
 Boys (2014 film), or Jongens, a Dutch television film by Mischa Kamp
 Boys (2018 film), or I am Jonas, a French film by Christophe Charrier
 Boys (2022 film), a South Korean film by Jung Ji-young

Television
 The Boys (1993 TV series), an American sitcom
 The Boys (franchise), an American media franchise by Amazon Prime Video consisting of several television series adapting the comic book series The Boys (see below)
 The Boys (TV series), a 2019 live-action adaptation of the comic book series
 The Boys: Seven on 7, a 2021 live-action promotional web series
 The Boys Presents: Diabolical, a 2022 animated anthology adaptation of the comic book series
 Gen V, a 2023 live-action adaptation of the comic book series arc "We Gotta Go Now"

Literature
 "Boys" (short story), an 1887 story by Anton Chekhov
 The Boys (comics), a 2006–2012 American comic book series by Garth Ennis and Darick Robertson
 The Boys, a 1996 book by Martin Gilbert

Music

Groups
 Boys (Australian band), a 1980s rock band 	
 The Boys (American band), now Suns of Light, an American R&B quartet
 The Boys (English band), a 1970s–1980s punk rock band
 The  Action, originally the Boys, a 1960s English rock band
 Dʼ Boys (pronounced as The Boys), a 1980s Yugoslav band

Albums 
 Boys (Dean Brody album) or the title song (see below), 2020
 Boys (Herzog album) or the title song, 2014
 The Boys (American band the Boys album), 1990
 The Boys (English band The Boys album), 1977
 The Boys (Girls' Generation album) or the title song (see below), 2011
 The Boys (The Necks album) or the title song, 1998
 The Boys (Cleopatrick EP), 2018
 The Boys (The Shadows EP) or the title song, 1962

Songs
 "Boys" (Britney Spears song), 2002
 "Boys" (Charli XCX song), 2017
 "Boys" (Dean Brody song), 2020
 "Boys" (Lizzo song), 2018
 "Boys" (The Maybes? song), 2008
 "Boys" (The Shirelles song), 1960; covered by the Beatles, 1963
 "Boys" (Sky Ferreira song), 2013
 "Boys (Summertime Love)", by Sabrina, 1987
 "Boys! (What Did the Detective Say?)", by the Sports, 1978
 "Boys", by Ashlee Simpson from Bittersweet World, 2008
 "Boys", by Astrid S and Lars Vaular, 2017
 "Boys", by Band Ohne Namen, 2000
 "Boys", by Bauhaus, B-side to the single "Bela Lugosi's Dead", 1979
 "Boys", by Brockhampton from Saturation, 2017
 "Boys", by Gabriella Cilmi from Ten, 2010
 "Boys", by Mary Jane Girls from Mary Jane Girls, 1983
 "Boys", by Mutya Keisha Siobhan, a reformed version of Sugababes, 2013
 "Boys", by Robots in Disguise from Disguises, 2001
 "Boys", by Smile.dk from Smile, 1998
 "Boys", by Sugababes from The Lost Tapes, 2022
 "Boys (Lesson One)", by Jars of Clay from The Long Fall Back to Earth, 2009
 "Les Boys", by Dire Straits from Making Movies, 1980
 "The Boys" (Girls' Generation song), 2011
 "The Boys" (Nicki Minaj and Cassie song), 2012

Other uses
 Boys (surname), a list of people with the name
 Boys anti-tank rifle, a British anti-tank weapon
 The Boys (professional wrestling) or the Tate Twins, an American tag team
 Dallas Cowboys, an NFL team nicknamed "the 'Boys"
 Jesse Evans Gang or The Boys, an outlaw gang of the American Old West

See also
 
 Boys Boys Boys (disambiguation)
 Boy (disambiguation)
 Bois (disambiguation)
 Boise (disambiguation)
 Boyz (disambiguation)